The Salt River is a tributary of the Mississippi River in eastern Missouri in the United States.

It rises at the confluence of the North, Middle, and South Forks in Monroe County. Since Clarence Cannon Dam construction was completed in 1983, the first 15 miles of the Salt River after the confluence of the North, Middle, and South Fork have been contained in Mark Twain Lake. Below the dam, the river winds generally east for 63 miles through a rural valley surrounded by low bluffs. Below New London, it receives Spencer and Peno Creeks from the right. The Salt joins the Mississippi River at Ted Shanks Wildlife Conservation Area (River Mile 284) just one mile north of US Route 54 bridge in Louisiana in Pike County.

The river was called "Ohaha" by the Native Americans that once lived along its course.  It was also known as "the river Jeffreon" in the 1804 Treaty of St. Louis.  American author Mark Twain was born in the town of Florida on the Salt River in 1835.

See also
List of rivers of Missouri

References

External links
Map of Mark Twain Lake and Dam
Ted Shanks Wildlife Conservation Area

Rivers of Missouri
Tributaries of the Mississippi River
Rivers of Monroe County, Missouri
Rivers of Pike County, Missouri
Rivers of Ralls County, Missouri